Bacillus gaemokensis is a bacterium. It is a Gram-positive, rod-shaped, endospore-forming organism  with the type strain BL3-6T (=KCTC 13318T =JCM 15801T).

References

Further reading

External links

WORMS entry
Type strain of Bacillus gaemokensis at BacDive -  the Bacterial Diversity Metadatabase

gaemokensis